Lucie Aubrac is a 1997 French biopic of the World War II French Resistance member Lucie Aubrac. The film starred Carole Bouquet in the title role and was directed by Claude Berri. The story loosely follows the role of Lucie Aubrac and her husband during the Second World War and their parts in the resistance in Lyon. The film was entered into the 47th Berlin International Film Festival.

Cast
 Carole Bouquet as Lucie Aubrac
 Daniel Auteuil as Raymond
 Patrice Chéreau as Max
 Eric Boucher as Serge
 Jean-Roger Milo as Maurice
 Heino Ferch as Barbie
 Jean Martin as Paul Lardanchet
 Andrzej Seweryn as Lt. Schlondorff
 Alain Maratrat as Lassagne
 Pascal Greggory as Hardy
 Jean-Louis Richard as M. Henry
 Franck de la Personne as Aubry
 Bernard Verley as Charles-Henri
 Jacques Bonnaffé as Pascal

Reception
The film opened in second place at the French box office behind fellow opener Mars Attacks! with a gross of $3.3 million for the week from 335 screens.

References

External links

1997 films
French war drama films
French biographical drama films
1990s biographical drama films
1990s French-language films
Films about the French Resistance
Films set in Lyon
Films directed by Claude Berri
Films with screenplays by Claude Berri
Films scored by Philippe Sarde
1997 drama films
1999 drama films
1999 films
1990s French films